A lipoxin (LX or Lx), an acronym for lipoxygenase interaction product, is a bioactive autacoid metabolite of arachidonic acid made by various cell types. They are categorized as nonclassic eicosanoids and members of the specialized pro-resolving mediators (SPMs) family of polyunsaturated fatty acid (PUFA) metabolites. Like other SPMs, LXs form during, and then act to resolve, inflammatory responses. Initially, two lipoxins were identified, lipoxin A4 (LXA4) and LXB4, but more recent studies have identified epimers of these two LXs: the epi-lipoxins, 15-epi-LXA4 and 15-epi-LXB4 respectively.

History
LXA4 and LXB4 were first described by Serhan, Hamberg, and the Nobel laurate Samuelsson in 1984.  They reported that human blood neutrophils, when stimulated, make these two lipoxins and that neutrophils, when stimulated by either of the LXs, mounted superoxide anion (O2−) generation and degranulation responses. Both responses are considered to be pro-inflammatory in that, while aimed at neutralizing invading pathogens and digesting foreign material, can contribute to damaging host tissues and thereby prolonging and promoting further inflammation. Subsequent studies, however, found that these lipoxins, as well as their epimers, epi-LXA4 and LXB4, act primarily to dampen and resolve inflammation, i.e. they are anti-inflammatory cell signaling agents.

Biochemistry
Lipoxins are derived enzymatically from arachidonic acid, an ω-6 fatty acid. Structurally, they are defined as arachidonic acid metabolites that contain three hydroxyl residues (also termed hydroxy residues) and four double bonds. This structural definition distinguishes them from other SPMs such as the resolvins, neuroprotectins, and maresins, which are metabolites of the omega 3 fatty acids, eicosapentaenoic acid or docosahexaenoic acid, as well as a range of metabolites derived from other PUFAs (see specialized pro-resolving mediators). All of these other SPMs have activities and functions similar, although not necessarily identical, to the lipoxins .

Synthesis
Formation of LXs is conserved across a broad range of animal species from fish to humans.  Biosynthesis of the LXs requires two separate enzymatic attacks on arachidonic acid (AA). One attack involves attachment of a hydroperoxy  (-O-OH) residue to carbon 15, conversion of this species to a 14,15-epoxide, and the resolution of this epoxide to form either 14,15-dihydroxy-eicosatetraenoate or 15-hydroxy-eicosatetraenoate products. This step is catalyzed by enzymes with 15-lipoxygenase activity which in humans includes ALOX15, ALOX12, aspirin-treated cyclooxygenase 2, and cytochrome P450s of the microsomal, mitochondrial, or bacterial subclasses. ALOX15B may also conduct this metabolism. The other enzyme attack point forms a 5,6-epoxide which is resolved to either 5,6-dihydroxy-eicosatetraenoate or 5-hydroxy eicosatetraenoate products; this step catalyzed by 5-lipoxygenase (ALOX5). Accordingly, these double oxygenations yield either 5,6,15-trihydroxy- or 5,14,15-trihydroxy-eicosatetraenoates. The double oxygenations may be conducted within a single cell type which possess ALOX5 and an enzyme with 15-lipoxygenase activity or, alternatively, by two different cell types, each of which possesses one of these enzyme activities. In the latter transcellular biosynthetic pathway, one cell type forms either the 5,6-dihydroxy-, 5-hydroxy, 14,15-dihydroxy- or a 15-hydroxy-eicosatetraenoate, and then passes this intermediate to a second cell type, which metabolizes it to the final LX product. For example, LXs are formed by platelets which, lacking ALOX5, cannot synthesize them. Rather, neutrophils form, the 5,6-epoxide, leukotriene A4 (LTA4), via ALOX5 and passed it to platelets that then reduce it a 5,6-dihydroxy-eicosateteraenoate product and further metabolize it through ALOX12 to form the 15-hydroxy product, LXA4. The two LXs are distinguished form their 15-epi-LTX epimers by their structural formulae:

LxA4: 5S,6R,15S-trihydroxy-7E,9E,11Z,13E-eicosatetraenoic acid
LxB4: 5S,14R,15S-trihydroxy-6E,8Z,10E,12E-eicosatetraenoic acid
15-epi-LxA4: 5S,6R,15R-trihydroxy-7E,9E,11Z,13E-eicosatetraenoic acid    
15-epi-LxB4: 5S,14R,15R-trihydroxy-6E,8Z,10E,12E-eicosatrienoic acid
 
Note that the two LXs have their 15-hydroxyl residues in the S chirality configuration because all of the ALOX enzymes form 15S-hydroxy AA products. In contrast, the 15-hydroxy residues of the two epi-LXs are 15R chirality products because they are synthesized by aspirin-treated cyclooxygenase 2 or the microsomal, mitochondrial, or bacterial Cytochrome P450s; these enzymes form almost entirely or partly 15R-hydroxy products. (15-Epi-LTA44 and 15-epi-LTB44 are sometimes termed AT-LxA4 and AT-LxB4, respectively, when acknowledging their formation by aspirin-treated cyclooxygenase 2, i.e. by Aspirin-Triggered cyclooxygenase 2.)

In addition to the pathways cited above, other transcellular metabolic routes have been shown to make LXs. For example, 5-lipoxygenase (i.e. (ALOX5) in neutrophils and 15-lipoxygenase-1 (i.e. ALOX15) in immature erythrocytes and reticulocytes operate in series to form LxA44 and LxB44; this pathway also occurs in serial interactions between neutrophils and eosinophils; between epithelium or M2 Macrophages/monocytes and neutrophils; and endothelium or skeletal muscle and neutrophils.

Stimulation of synthesis
The lipoxins commonly form as a consequence of stimulating the production of pro-inflammatory arachidonic acid metabolites. However, certain cytokines such as IFN-γ and IL-1β further increase production of the lipoxins (as well as other anti-inflammatory PUFA metabolites and proteins, e.g. IL4.

Further metabolism
LXs are rapidly metabolized, mainly by macrophages, to inactive products by being oxidized at carbon 15 to form 15-keto (also termed 15-oxo) LX products by a 15-hydroxyprostaglandin dehydrogenase; 15-oxo-LXA4 may be further metabolized to 13,14-dihydro-LXA4 by an oxidoreductase. 15-Epi-LXA4 and 15-epi-LXB4 are more resistant to the dehydrogenation enzyme than their LX epimers. In consequence of the operation of this anabolic pathway, LXs have very short half-lives in vivo, the epi-LXs have longer in vivo half-lives and thereby greater potencies than their LX epimers, and synthetic lipoxins that are metabolically resistant to this pathway have been prepared, used in animal models to study LX activities, and tested as potential therapeutic agents in animals and humans.

Similar to various other AA metabolites such as LTA4 and 5-oxo-eicosatetraenoic acid, cells and tissues may convert LXs to 20-hydroxy products by omega oxidation; they also have been shown to ligate LXA4 to glutathione to form cysteinyl-lipoxins, initially LXC4, which is then sequentially metabolized to LXD4 and LXE4. The role of these pathways in limiting or contributing to the activity of the LXs has not been fully evaluated.

Endocannabinoid system 
It is found that the anti-inflammatory lipid lipoxin A4 is an endogenous allosteric enhancer of the CB1 cannabinoid receptor. Lipoxin A4 enhance the affinity of anandamide at this receptor to exert cannabimimetic effects in the brain, by allosterically enhancing AEA signaling and thereby potentiating the effects of this endocannabinoid both in vitro and in vivo. In addition to this, lipoxin A4 display a CB1 receptor-dependent protective effect against β-amyloid-induced spatial memory impairment in mice.

Lipoxin analogues
Relatively stable, i.e. metabolically resistant, synthetic analogues of LXs and aspirin-triggered 15-epi-LXA4s can mimic many of the desirable anti-inflammatory, "pro-resolution" actions of native LXs and are being tested for clinical use.  Structurally, these LX analogs often mimic the LXs in being or closely resembling a 20-carbon trihydroxy fatty acid, but are resistant to 15-hydroxyprostaglandin dehydrogenase metabolic inactivation by having a bulky or other structural modification near their 15-hydroxy residues. For example, certain analogs simply alter an LX's structure by:  replacing a hydrogen atom with a methyl residue at carbon 15 on LXA4 to form 15-methyl-LXA4; changing the last 4 carbons of LXA4 or 15-epi-LXA4 to a 1-phenoxy residue or 1-phenoxy-4-fluoro residue to form 16-phenoxy-LX4, 15-epi-15-phenoxy-LXA4, 16-(para-fluoro-phenoxy-LXA4, or 15-epi-16-(para-fluoro-phenoxy-LXA4; and forming a bond between carbon 9 and carbon 14 of LXA4 to form an internal phenyl ring analog termed aromatic LXA4; other, more complex structural analogs in development include 15-epi-LXA4 analogs termed ZK-142 and ZK994.

Biological activity

Cellular studies
In the initial phases of many acute inflammatory responses, damaged tissues, invading pathogens, and other local events cause nearby cells to make and release arachidonic acid-derived pro-inflammatory metabolites such as: leukotrienes (LTs), e.g. LTB4, LTB4, LTC4, LTD4, and LTE4; hydroxyeicosatetraenoic acids (HETEs), e.g. 5-HETE and 12-HETE; and oxoeicosanoids (oxo-ETE), e.g. 5-oxo-eicosatetraenoic acid (5-oxo-ETE) and 12-oxo-ETE.  These metabolites proceed to act directly or indirectly to recruit circulating leukocytes, tissue macrophages, and tissue dendritic cells to the disturbed tissue site. The consequential congregation of the various cell types promotes transcellular pathways in forming specialized pro-resolving mediators (SPMs), including the LXs, which then proceed to stimulate cellular and tissue responses that trend to reverse the actions of the pro-inflammatory mediators, dampen and reverse the inflammatory response, and initiate tissue repair.

LXA4 and 15-epi-LXA4 are high affinity receptor ligands for and activators of the FPR2 receptor. FPR2, which is now termed the ALX, ALX/FPR, or ALX/FPR2 receptor, is a G protein coupled receptor initially identified as a receptor for the leukocyte chemotactic factor, N-Formylmethionine-leucyl-phenylalanine (FMLP), based on its amino acid sequence similarity to the known FMLP receptor, FPR1. At least six homologues of this receptor are found in mice.  ALX/FPR is a promiscuous (i.e. interacting with diverse ligands) receptor that binds and is activated by other ligands including: a) various N-formyl oligopeptides that, like FMLP, are either released by microbes and mitochondria or are analogs of those released by microbes and mitochondria; b) microbe-derived non-formyl oligopeptides; c) certain polypeptides that are associated with the development of chronic amyloidosis and/or inflammation including Serum amyloid A (SAA) proteins), a 42-amino acid peptide form Amyloid beta termed Aβ42, Humanin, and a cleaved soluble fragment (amino acids 274-388) from the Urokinase receptor; and d) other SPMs including Resolvins RvD1, RvD2, RvD5, AT-RvD1, and RvD3 (see specialized pro-resolving mediators).

LXA4 and 15-epi-LXA4 inhibit chemotaxis, transmigration, superoxide generation, NF-κB activation, and/or generation of pro-inflammatory cytokines (e.g. IL8, IL13, IL12, and IL5) by neutrophils, eosinophils, monocytes, Innate lymphoid cells, and/or macrophages, as well as suppress proliferation and production of IgM and IgG antibodies by B lymphocytes. These actions appear to involve stimulating anti-inflammatory signaling pathways, but also blocking the actions of other ALX/FPR ligands which simulate pro-inflammatory pathways. Transgenic mice made to overexpress ALX/FPR exhibit markedly reduced inflammatory responses to diverse insults. LXA4 and 15-epi-LXA4, when introduced by Intrathecal administration into rodents, suppress the perception of inflammatory pain; this action may involve the ALX/FPR receptor shown to be present on the spinal astrocytes of test animal and, based on studies using 15-epi-LXA, inhibition of the NALP1 inflammasome signaling complex.

By mechanisms yet to be clearly identified, the two LX's also: a) stimulate the bacteria-killing capacity of leukocytes and airway epithelial cells; b) block production of the pro-inflammatory cytokine, TNFα, while increasing production of the anti-inflammatory cytokine, CCR5 by T lymphocytes; c)' enhance the ability of monocytes and macrophages to phagocytos (i.e. ingest) and thereby remove potentially injurious apoptotic neutrophils and eosinophils from inflammatory sites (see Efferocytosis) either by direct effecting these cells or by stimulating NK cells to do so; d) cause various cell types to reduce production of pro-inflammatory reactive oxygen species and expression of Cell adhesion molecules and increase production of the platelet inhibitor, PGI2 and the vasodilator, nitric oxide; e) inhibit production of pro-inflammatory cytokines by mesangial cells, fibroblasts, and other pro-inflammatory cell types; and f) reduce perception of pain due to inflammation.

LXA4 and 15-epi-LTA4 also act by mobilizing transcription factors that regulate expression of various inflammation-regulating genes. LXA4 stimulates various cell types to promote the entry of Nrf2 into the nucleus and thereby to increase the expression of genes such as heme oxygenase-1 (HMOX1), which increases production of the anti-inflammatory gaseous signaling agent, carbon monoxide, and genes involved in the synthesis of glutathione, a product which neutralizes oxidative stress and oxidant-induced tissue damage. Metabolically resistant structural analogs of LXB4 and 15-epi-LXA4 inhibit formation of Peroxynitrite (i.e. ONOO−) to attenuate the mobilization of NFκB and AP-1 transcription factors by reducing their accumulation in the nucleus of neutrophils, monocytes, and lymphocytes; NFκB and AP-1 increase expression of pro-inflammatory genes. The two LXBs also trigger activation of Suppressor of cytokine signaling proteins (see SOCS proteins) which, in turn, inhibit activation of STAT protein transcription factors which up-regulate many genes making pro-inflammatory products.

LXA4 and 15-epi-LXA4 are also high affinity antagonists of the Cysteinyl leukotriene receptor 1 for which leukotrienes (LT) LTC4, LTD4, and LTE4 are agonists, i.e. the three leukotrienes bind to and thereby stimulate smooth muscle contraction, eosinophil chemotactaxis, mucous gland secretion, and various other pro-allergic responses in the cells of lung, skin, and other tissues. (CysLT1 and ATX/FPR2 have an amino acid sequence identity of 47%.) The ability of these LXs to block the actions of the three LTs may contribute to their ability to resolve allergic reactions; for example, LXA4 relaxes the smooth muscle contraction caused by the cysteinyl leukotrienes in the hamster cheek pouch assay and a metabolically resistant 15-epi-LXAA4 analog potently inhibits allergen-driven airway hypersensitivity and inflammation in a mouse model.

At higher concentrations (>30 nmole/liter), LXA4 binds to AHR, the arylhydrocarbon receptor; following this binding, AHR enters the nucleus, where it joins with AhR nuclear translocator (ARNT). The AHR/ARNT complex binds to xenobiotic response elements to activate transcription of genes, most of which are involved primarily in xenobiotic metabolism. These genes include SOCS2 (i.e. suppressor of cytokine signaling 2), CYP1A1, CYP1A2, CYP1B1, glutathione S-transferase Ya subunit, quinone oxidoreductase, UDP-glucuronosyltransferase and Aldehyde dehydrogenase 3 family, member A1. This LXA4 activity has been demonstrated only in murine cells.

LXA4 binds to and activates estrogen receptor alpha. In this capacity, it mimics an estrogenic molecule to stimulate human endometrial epithelial cells in vitro and mouse uterine tissue in vivo.

The actions of LXB4 and 15-epi-LXB4 have been far less well defined than those of their LXA4 analogs. Their mechanism of stimulating target cells (e.g. receptors) is not known. One or both of these analogs have been shown to inhibit the recruitment of neutrophils to sites of inflammation, inhibit the cytotoxicity of NK cells, stimulate the recruitment of monocytes to inflammatory sites, enhance macrophage phagocytosis, and suppress the perception of inflammatory pain in rodents.

Animal model studies

Noninfectious inflammation
One or more of the lipoxins or their metabolically resistant analogs have been demonstrated to suppress, limit severity, and/or increase survival in a wide range of inflammatory and allergic diseases as evaluated in mouse and rat model studies. These studies include models of experimentally evoked: Endometriosis
, colitis, peritonitis; pancreatitis; kidney inflammation and glomerulonephritis; lung asthma, acid-induced lung injury, cystic fibrosis, pleurisy, brain inflammation and the inflammatory component of Alzheimer's disease; vascular ischemia-reperfusion injuries to various organs including the heart and hind limb; allograph Transplant rejection of heart, kidney, and bone marrow; arthritis; dermatitis; periodontitis; cornea inflammation; and inflammation-based pain and hyperalgesia.

Infection-related inflammation
Lipoxins have protective effects in animal models of infection-based inflammation: a) LXA4 and a LXA4 analog decreased systemic inflammation and improved survival in rat models of Gram-negative bacterial sepsis; b) 15-epi-LXA4 suppressed the lung injury (i.e., shock lung or Acute respiratory distress syndrome) caused by intraperitoneal injection of Escherichia coli in mice;  c) transgenic mice made deficient in lipoxin synthesis by deletion of their Alox5 gene were more susceptible to the inflammatory and lethal effects of Toxoplasma gondii and were rescued from these defects by LXA44; d)  LXA4 restored macrophage function caused by respiratory syncytial virus in transgenic mice made deficient of lipoxin synthesis by Alox5 gene deletion; e) LXA4 ameliorated infectious periodontitis in rabbit and porcine models. f) 15-epi-LXA4 decreased parasite blood levels, decrease cardiac inflammation, and increase survival in a mouse model of Trypanosoma cruzi-induced Chagas disease; f)' 15-epi-LXA4 prolonged survival in a mouse model of Plasmodium berghei-induced cerebral malaria; and g) LXA4 shortens the duration of the allergic response to the parasitic infestation, Angiostrongylus costaricensis.

However, lipoxins also have harmful effects in these models: aerosol infection with Mycobacterium tuberculosis in transgenic mice defective in ALOX5, which contributes to LX synthesis, exhibited far less severe inflammation and better survival than control mice; and  treatment of the transgenic mice with oral LXA4 reversed the protective effect of ALOX5 deletion.

Human studies

Preclinical studies
LXs and epi-LXs have been detected in a various human tissues undergoing a wide range of inflammatory reactions, allergic reactions, and other conditions such as in the blood of patients undergoing coronary angioplasty or strenuous exercise. LXA4 inhibits the-bronchial contracting action of LTC4 and relaxes pre-contracted bronchi in asthmatic individuals.

Kaposi's sarcoma-associated herpesvirus (KSHV) causes the malignant transformation of human cells and is responsible for Kaposi's sarcoma and primary effusion lymphoma, two cancers which afflict in particular humans infected with HIV. Studies in human Kaposi sarcoma and primary effusion lymphoma cells find that: a) KSHV promotes the production of pro-inflammatory cytokines, lipoxygenases, cyclooxygenase, and metabolites of the latter two classes of enzymes while suppressing production of anti-inflammatory signaling agents such as LXA4, apparently as a strategy to promote its latency and malignant transforming ability; b)' Kaposi sarcoma and primary effusion lymphoma cells express the ALX/FPR receptor; and c)' treatment of the latter cells with LXA4 or 15-epi-LXA4 reverses this pro-malignancy profile of pro-inflammatory signaling by an ALX/FPR-dependent mechanism. These studies suggest that the two LX's or their analogs should be tested in animal models to determine if the might be useful for treating the two human malignancies.

Clinical studies
In a randomized controlled trial, topical application of 15-epi-LXA4 or a comparatively stable analog of LXB4, 15R/S-methyl-LXB4, reduced the severity of eczema in a study of 60 infants.

Currently, BLXA4, a lipoxin analog, is in clinical trial phase 1 and currently recruiting volunteers for treating oral gingivitis (see: Safety and Preliminary Efficacy of Lipoxin Analog BLXA4-ME Oral Rinse for the Treatment of Gingivitis (BLXA4) at https://clinicaltrials.gov/ct2/show/NCT02342691?term=Lipoxin&rank=3).

See also
 Epi-lipoxins
 Specialized pro-resolving mediators
 15-Hydroxyeicosatetraenoic acid

References

External links
 

Eicosanoids